This is a list of the mammal species recorded in Eritrea. Of the mammal species in Eritrea, one is critically endangered, two are endangered, ten are vulnerable, and three are near threatened.

The following tags are used to highlight each species' conservation status as assessed by the International Union for Conservation of Nature:

Some species were assessed using an earlier set of criteria. Species assessed using this system have the following instead of near threatened and least concern categories:

Order: Tubulidentata (aardvarks) 

The order Tubulidentata consists of a single species, the aardvark. Tubulidentata are characterised by their teeth which lack a pulp cavity and form thin tubes which are continuously worn down and replaced.

Family: Orycteropodidae
Genus: Orycteropus
 Aardvark, O. afer

Order: Hyracoidea (hyraxes) 

The hyraxes are any of four species of fairly small, thickset, herbivorous mammals in the order Hyracoidea. About the size of a domestic cat they are well-furred, with rounded bodies and a stumpy tail. They are native to Africa and the Middle East.

Family: Procaviidae (hyraxes)
Genus: Heterohyrax
 Yellow-spotted rock hyrax, Heterohyrax brucei LC
Genus: Procavia
 Cape hyrax, Procavia capensis LC

Order: Proboscidea (elephants) 

The elephants comprise three living species and are the largest living land animals.
Family: Elephantidae (elephants)
Genus: Loxodonta
African bush elephant, L. africana

Order: Sirenia (manatees and dugongs) 

Sirenia is an order of fully aquatic, herbivorous mammals that inhabit rivers, estuaries, coastal marine waters, swamps, and marine wetlands. All four species are endangered.

Family: Dugongidae
Genus: Dugong
 Dugong, Dugong dugon VU

Order: Primates 

The order Primates contains humans and their closest relatives: lemurs, lorisoids, tarsiers, monkeys, and apes.

Suborder: Strepsirrhini
Infraorder: Lemuriformes
Superfamily: Lorisoidea
Family: Galagidae
Genus: Galago
 Senegal bushbaby, Galago senegalensis LR/lc
Suborder: Haplorhini
Infraorder: Simiiformes
Parvorder: Catarrhini
Superfamily: Cercopithecoidea
Family: Cercopithecidae (Old World monkeys)
Genus: Chlorocebus
 Grivet, Chlorocebus aethiops LR/lc
Genus: Papio
 Olive baboon, Papio anubis LR/lc
 Hamadryas baboon, Papio hamadryas LR/nt
Genus: Theropithecus
 Gelada, Theropithecus gelada LR/nt
Subfamily: Colobinae
Genus: Colobus
 Mantled guereza, Colobus guereza LR/lc

Order: Rodentia (rodents) 

Rodents make up the largest order of mammals, with over 40% of mammalian species. They have two incisors in the upper and lower jaw which grow continually and must be kept short by gnawing.

Suborder: Hystricognathi
Family: Hystricidae (Old World porcupines)
Genus: Hystrix
 Crested porcupine, Hystrix cristata LC
Suborder: Sciurognathi
Family: Sciuridae (squirrels)
Subfamily: Xerinae
Tribe: Xerini
Genus: Xerus
 Striped ground squirrel, Xerus erythropus LC
 Unstriped ground squirrel, Xerus rutilus LC
Tribe: Protoxerini
Genus: Heliosciurus
 Gambian sun squirrel, Heliosciurus gambianus LC
Family: Gliridae (dormice)
Subfamily: Graphiurinae
Genus: Graphiurus
 Small-eared dormouse, Graphiurus microtis LC
Family: Dipodidae (jerboas)
Subfamily: Dipodinae
Genus: Jaculus
 Lesser Egyptian jerboa, Jaculus jaculus LC
Family: Cricetidae
Subfamily: Lophiomyinae
Genus: Lophiomys
 Maned rat, Lophiomys imhausi LC
Family: Muridae (mice, rats, voles, gerbils, hamsters, etc.)
Subfamily: Deomyinae
Genus: Acomys
 Mullah spiny mouse, Acomys mullah LC
Subfamily: Gerbillinae
Genus: Gerbillus
 Somalia gerbil, Gerbillus dunni DD
Genus: Tatera
 Fringe-tailed gerbil, Tatera robusta LC
Subfamily: Murinae
Genus: Arvicanthis
 Abyssinian grass rat, Arvicanthis abyssinicus LC
 African grass rat, Arvicanthis niloticus LC
Genus: Mus
 Delicate mouse, Mus tenellus LC
Genus: Stenocephalemys
 Ethiopian white-footed mouse, Stenocephalemys albipes LC
Family: Ctenodactylidae
Genus: Pectinator
 Speke's pectinator, Pectinator spekei DD

Order: Lagomorpha (lagomorphs) 

The lagomorphs comprise two families, Leporidae (hares and rabbits), and Ochotonidae (pikas). Though they can resemble rodents, and were classified as a superfamily in that order until the early 20th century, they have since been considered a separate order. They differ from rodents in a number of physical characteristics, such as having four incisors in the upper jaw rather than two.

Family: Leporidae (rabbits, hares)
Genus: Lepus
 Cape hare, Lepus capensis LR/lc

Order: Erinaceomorpha (hedgehogs and gymnures) 

The order Erinaceomorpha contains a single family, Erinaceidae, which comprise the hedgehogs and gymnures. The hedgehogs are easily recognised by their spines while gymnures look more like large rats.

Family: Erinaceidae (hedgehogs)
Subfamily: Erinaceinae
Genus: Hemiechinus
 Desert hedgehog, Hemiechinus aethiopicus LR/lc

Order: Soricomorpha (shrews, moles, and solenodons) 

The "shrew-forms" are insectivorous mammals. The shrews and solenodons closely resemble mice while the moles are stout-bodied burrowers.

Family: Soricidae (shrews)
Subfamily: Crocidurinae
Genus: Crocidura
 Savanna shrew, Crocidura fulvastra LC
 Mauritanian shrew, Crocidura lusitania LC
 Savanna path shrew, Crocidura viaria LC

Order: Chiroptera (bats) 

The bats' most distinguishing feature is that their forelimbs are developed as wings, making them the only mammals capable of flight. Bat species account for about 20% of all mammals.
Family: Pteropodidae (flying foxes, Old World fruit bats)
Subfamily: Pteropodinae
Genus: Eidolon
 Straw-coloured fruit bat, Eidolon helvum LC
Genus: Epomophorus
 Ethiopian epauletted fruit bat, Epomophorus labiatus LC
Genus: Rousettus
 Egyptian fruit bat, Rousettus aegyptiacus LC
Family: Vespertilionidae
Subfamily: Vespertilioninae
Genus: Barbastella
 Asian barbastelle, Barbastella leucomelas LR/lc
Genus: Eptesicus
 Botta's serotine, Eptesicus bottae LC
Genus: Neoromicia
 Cape serotine, Neoromicia capensis LC
 Banana pipistrelle, Neoromicia nanus LC
 Somali serotine, Neoromicia somalicus LC
Genus: Nycticeinops
 Schlieffen's bat, Nycticeinops schlieffeni LC
Genus: Plecotus
 Ethiopian big-eared bat, Plecotus balensis VU
Genus: Scotophilus
 African yellow bat, Scotophilus dinganii LC
Family: Rhinopomatidae
Genus: Rhinopoma
 Egyptian mouse-tailed bat, R. cystops 
 Lesser mouse-tailed bat, Rhinopoma hardwickei LC
 Greater mouse-tailed bat, Rhinopoma microphyllum LC
Family: Molossidae
Genus: Chaerephon
 Spotted free-tailed bat, Chaerephon bivittata LC
 Little free-tailed bat, Chaerephon pumila LC
Genus: Mops
 Midas free-tailed bat, Mops midas LC
Genus: Tadarida
 African giant free-tailed bat, Tadarida ventralis NT
Family: Emballonuridae
Genus: Coleura
 African sheath-tailed bat, Coleura afra LC
Genus: Taphozous
 Naked-rumped tomb bat, Taphozous nudiventris LC
Family: Nycteridae
Genus: Nycteris
 Egyptian slit-faced bat, Nycteris thebaica LC
Family: Megadermatidae
Genus: Cardioderma
 Heart-nosed bat, Cardioderma cor LC
Genus: Lavia
 Yellow-winged bat, Lavia frons LC
Family: Rhinolophidae
Subfamily: Rhinolophinae
Genus: Rhinolophus
Blasius's horseshoe bat, R. blasii 
 Geoffroy's horseshoe bat, Rhinolophus clivosus LC
 Rüppell's horseshoe bat, Rhinolophus fumigatus LC
 Lesser horseshoe bat, Rhinolophus hipposideros LC
Subfamily: Hipposiderinae
Genus: Asellia
 Patrizi's trident leaf-nosed bat, Asellia patrizii VU
 Trident leaf-nosed bat, Asellia tridens LC
Genus: Hipposideros
 Sundevall's roundleaf bat, Hipposideros caffer LC
 Ethiopian large-eared roundleaf bat, Hipposideros megalotis NT

Order: Cetacea (whales) 

The order Cetacea includes whales, dolphins and porpoises. They are the mammals most fully adapted to aquatic life with a spindle-shaped nearly hairless body, protected by a thick layer of blubber, and forelimbs and tail modified to provide propulsion underwater.

Suborder: Odontoceti
Superfamily: Platanistoidea
Family: Delphinidae (marine dolphins)
Genus: Delphinus
 Long-beaked common dolphin, Delphinus capensis DD
Genus: Globicephala
 Short-finned pilot whale, Globicephala macrorhyncus DD
Genus: Grampus
 Risso's dolphin, Grampus griseus DD
Genus: Orcinus
 Killer whale, Orcinus orca DD
Genus: Sousa
 Indian humpback dolphin, Sousa plumbea DD
Genus: Stenella
 Pantropical spotted dolphin, Stenella attenuata DD
 Striped dolphin, Stenella coeruleoalba DD
 Spinner dolphin, Stenella longirostris DD
Genus: Steno
 Rough-toothed dolphin, Steno bredanensis DD
Genus: Tursiops
 Common bottlenose dolphin, Tursiops truncatus
 Indo-Pacific bottlenose dolphin, Tursiops aduncus
Superfamily Ziphioidea
Family: Ziphidae (beaked whales)
Genus: Indopacetus
 Tropical bottlenose whale, Indopacetus pacificus DD
Genus: Mesoplodon
 Ginkgo-toothed beaked whale, Mesoplodon ginkgodens DD
 Blainville's beaked whale, Mesoplodon densirostris DD

Order: Carnivora (carnivorans) 

There are over 260 species of carnivorans, the majority of which feed primarily on meat. They have a characteristic skull shape and dentition. 
Suborder: Feliformia
Family: Felidae (cats)
Subfamily: Felinae
Genus: Acinonyx
Species: Acinonyx jubatus VU
Genus: Caracal
 Caracal, Caracal caracal LC
Genus: Felis
 African wildcat, Felis lybica LC
Genus: Leptailurus
 Serval, Leptailurus serval LC
Subfamily: Pantherinae
Genus: Panthera
Species: Panthera leo VU
Species: Panthera pardus NT
African leopard, P. p. pardus
Family: Hyaenidae (hyaenas)
Genus: Crocuta
 Spotted hyena, Crocuta crocuta LR/cd
Genus: Hyaena
 Striped hyena, Hyaena hyaena LR/nt
Genus: Proteles
 Aardwolf, Proteles cristatus LR/lc
Suborder: Caniformia
Family: Canidae (dogs, foxes)
Genus: Vulpes
 Pale fox, Vulpes pallida DD
Genus: Canis
 African golden wolf, Canis lupaster LC
 Black-backed jackal, Canis mesomelas LC
Genus: Lycaon
Genus: Lycaon
 African wild dog, L. pictus  extirpated
Family: Mustelidae (mustelids)
Genus: Ictonyx
 Striped polecat, Ictonyx striatus LR/lc
Genus: Mellivora
Honey badger, Mellivora capensis 
Genus: Hydrictis
 Speckle-throated otter, Hydrictis maculicollis LC
Genus: Aonyx
 African clawless otter, Aonyx capensis LC

Order: Perissodactyla (odd-toed ungulates) 

The odd-toed ungulates are browsing and grazing mammals. They are usually large to very large, and have relatively simple stomachs and a large middle toe.

Family: Equidae (horses etc.)
Genus: Equus
African wild ass, E. africanus 
Somali wild ass, E. a. somaliensis

Order: Artiodactyla (even-toed ungulates) 

The even-toed ungulates are ungulates whose weight is borne about equally by the third and fourth toes, rather than mostly or entirely by the third as in perissodactyls. There are about 220 artiodactyl species, including many that are of great economic importance to humans.

Family: Suidae (pigs)
Subfamily: Phacochoerinae
Genus: Phacochoerus
 Desert warthog, Phacochoerus aethiopicus LR/lc
 Common warthog, Phacochoerus africanus LR/lc
Family: Giraffidae (giraffe, okapi)
Genus: Giraffa
 Giraffe, Giraffa camelopardalis VU extirpated
Family: Bovidae (cattle, antelope, sheep, goats)
Subfamily: Alcelaphinae
Genus: Alcelaphus
 Hartebeest, Alcelaphus buselaphus LC possibly extirpated
Subfamily: Antilopinae
Genus: Gazella
 Dorcas gazelle, Gazella dorcas VU
 Red-fronted gazelle, Gazella rufifrons VU
 Soemmerring's gazelle, Gazella soemmerringii VU
Genus: Madoqua
 Salt's dik-dik, Madoqua saltiana LR/lc
Genus: Oreotragus
 Klipspringer, Oreotragus oreotragus LR/cd
Genus: Ourebia
 Oribi, Ourebia ourebi LR/cd
Subfamily: Bovinae
Genus: Syncerus
African buffalo, S. caffer NT extirpated
Genus: Tragelaphus
 Greater kudu, Tragelaphus strepsiceros LR/cd
Subfamily: Hippotraginae
Genus: Hippotragus
 Roan antelope, H. equinus LC extirpated
Genus: Oryx
 East African oryx, Oryx beisa EN possibly extirpated
Family: Hippopotamidae (hippopotamuses)
Genus: Hippopotamus
 Hippopotamus, Hippopotamus amphibius  extirpated

See also
List of chordate orders
Lists of mammals by region
List of prehistoric mammals
Mammal classification
List of mammals described in the 2000s

Notes

References
 

Eritrea
Eritrea
Mammals